Sandåker is a village in the municipality of Dønna in Nordland county, Norway. It is located on the south-central part of the island of Løkta.  It has the postal code 8813 Kopardal, named after the neighboring village of Kopardal, where the local ferry port is located.  Historically, the Sandåker area previously belonged to the municipality of Nesna, but since 1 January 1962 it has belonged to Dønna.  Løkta Church is located in Sandåker.

References

Dønna
Villages in Nordland